Alita is a feminine given name used primarily in English and Spanish .

Alita may refer to:

People
 Alita Fahey, Australian actress
 Alita Guillen (born 1970), U.S. reporter
 Alita Román (1912–1989), Argentine film actress

Battle Angel Alita
  Alita (Battle Angel Alita), the main character from a Japanese manga series 
 Battle Angel Alita, the Japanese manga series, starring the eponymous Alita
 Battle Angel (OVA), sometimes called "Alita", anime based on the manga
 Alita: Battle Angel, an American film based on the manga series

Lithuania
 Alita, Lithuania, a Belarusian name for the city of Alytus 
 Alita (company), a company from Alytus
 BC Alita, a former basketball club from Alytus

Other uses
 Alita, a character from Flight to Mars, the American film

See also

 
 
 
 Aelita (disambiguation)
 Elita (disambiguation)
 Aleta (disambiguation)
 Altia